The Holmul River is a river in northeastern Guatemala that flows through the Petén Basin region in the departamento (department) of El Petén towards the border with Belize. A number of significant pre-Columbian Maya sites lie along or near the course of this waterway, including Tikal, Nakum, Holmul, Naranjo, Yaxha and Witzna.

Rivers of Guatemala
Geography of Mesoamerica
Geography of the Petén Department